Spun is a 2002 film directed by Jonas Åkerlund.

Spun may also refer to:

 Spun (album), a 1998 album by Keller Williams
 "Spun", a song by Keller Williams on the album of the same name
 "Spun", a song by The Brian Jonestown Massacre on their 1998 album Strung Out in Heaven
 "Spun", a song by Methods of Mayhem on their 1999 album Methods of Mayhem
 "Spun", a song by VETO on their 2011 album Everything Is Amplified
 "Spun", a 2017 song by Ängie
 "Spun", a song by Chelsea Wolfe on her 2017 album Hiss Spun

See also 
 Spin (disambiguation)